Dexterity Software was a computer game company founded in 1994 in Los Angeles by Steve Pavlina. It began as a traditional retail game developer, but later changed to a shareware model. In 2004, Dexterity Software relocated to Las Vegas. The company ceased operations in late 2006.

Games
Dexterity Software published and/or distributed over a dozen games including the following:
Dweep and Dweep Gold (2002)
Fortune Raiders and Pirate's Plunder (1995, for 16/32-bit Windows)
Aargon Black Box (2003, for Windows 95/98/ME/NT/2000/XP)
 Aargon Deluxe (2002, for Windows 95/98/NT4/2000/XP)
 Blastorama (2003, for Windows 95/98/2000/ME/XP)
 Fitznik (2001, for Windows 95/98/2000/ME/XP)
 Fitznik 2 (2004, for Windows 95/98/2000/ME/XP)
 Gold Sprinter (2003, for Windows 95/98/2000/ME/XP)
 JumpStar (1999, for 16/32-bit Windows)
 Rocknor's Bad Day (2003, for Windows 98/NT4/ME/2000/XP)
 Rocknor's Donut Factory (2004, for Windows 98 or later)
 SNOWY: The Bear's Adventures (2003, for Windows 95 or later)
 Stockboy (2002, for Windows 95/98/NT4/2000/XP)

Articles
The Dexterity Software website also hosted a number of articles relevant to software developers such as
 If No Independent Developers Are 100 Times Smarter Than You, Then Why Do Some Get 100 Times the Results?; and
 If You've Tried Everything Imaginable And Your Product Still Won't Sell, Here's What You're Missing.

The significance of these articles was recognised by the Association of Shareware Professionals who listed Steve Pavlina on their Hall of Fame page, noting that he had had "a significant, lasting influence on others via his articles and postings."

Closure
Dexterity Software closed on October 31, 2006 when the founder Steve Pavlina retired from game development to focus on a personal development web site and blog, StevePavlina.com.

References

Video game companies based in California
Defunct companies based in Greater Los Angeles
Defunct video game companies of the United States